John Dudley Massingham CMG (1 February 1930 – 16 March 2009) was a British diplomat. He was Governor of Saint Helena from 1981 to 1984. He later served as British High Commission to Guyana from 1986 to 1987.

Massingham was a commissioner of the Pearce Commission on Rhodesian opinion.

References
 

1930 births
2009 deaths
Place of birth missing
Place of death missing
Governors of Saint Helena
Companions of the Order of St Michael and St George
People educated at Dulwich College
Alumni of Magdalene College, Cambridge
Alumni of Magdalen College, Oxford
Colonial Service officers
Members of HM Diplomatic Service